Anthony Lewis (born 11 April 1949) is a Trinidadian cricketer. He played in eighteen first-class matches for Trinidad and Tobago from 1966 to 1972.

See also
 List of Trinidadian representative cricketers

References

External links
 

1949 births
Living people
Trinidad and Tobago cricketers